John Meehan (June 13, 1902 – May 15, 1963) was an American art director and production designer.

He was born in Tehachapi, California and attended the University of Southern California. Meehan won three Academy Awards for his art direction: William Wyler's The Heiress (1949), Billy Wilder's Sunset Boulevard (1950) and Richard Fleischer's 1954 adaptation of the Jules Verne classic for Walt Disney, 20,000 Leagues Under the Sea. He also worked on 
The Strange Love of Martha Ivers (1946), Golden Earrings (1947), Samson and Delilah (1949), Salome (1953) and It Should Happen to You (1956).

See also 
 Art Directors Guild Hall of Fame

References

External links

1902 births
1963 deaths
American art directors
Best Art Direction Academy Award winners
People from Kern County, California
USC School of Architecture alumni
Place of death missing
American production designers